CRN is an American computer magazine. It was first launched as Computer Retail Week on June 7, 1982, as a magazine targeted to computer resellers. It soon after was renamed Computer Reseller News.

History and profile
Originally launched in 1982 and published by CMP Media of Manhasset, New York, United States, CRN was subsequently purchased by London-based United Business Media (UBM) as part of the $920 million acquisition of CMP. Computer Reseller News later changed its name to the acronym CRN and is still published today by franchise publishers in a number of other countries including Australia, Denmark, Germany, the Netherlands, India, Poland, Russia, the United Kingdom, and the United States. The Australian CRN is published by nextmedia, the UK version of CRN is published by Incisive Media which acquired VNU Business Publications UK in 2007 and the U.S. version is published by The Channel Company which acquired UBM Channel under management buyout from UBM in 2013.

The headquarters of the magazine is in Westborough, Massachusetts. In 2009 CRN's U.S. version was recognized as a leading advertising medium for the IT industry by B2B's Media Power 50 ranking, which called it the "unrivaled leader in covering the channel".

In January 2012, the UK version of CRN launched the CRN Sales and Marketing Awards. These awards recognise and reward the achievements of high-achieving information and communications technology companies.

References

External links
 CRN
 UK site
CRN Australla site

1982 establishments in Massachusetts
Computer magazines published in the United States
Magazines established in 1982
Magazines published in Massachusetts
Professional and trade magazines